The Southern Transcon is a main line of BNSF Railway comprising 11 subdivisions between Southern California and Chicago, Illinois. Completed in its current alignment in 1908 by the Atchison, Topeka and Santa Fe Railway, when it opened the Belen Cutoff in New Mexico (going through eastern New Mexico, northwestern Texas, briefly part of western Oklahoma and to Kansas) and bypassed the steep grades of Raton Pass (which passes through northeastern New Mexico and southwestern Colorado), it now serves as a mostly double-tracked intermodal corridor.

History 
The Atchison, Topeka and Santa Fe Railway completed a railroad between Chicago and Southern California in the 1880s. The route, built in stages, was less than ideal, especially where it crossed Raton Pass and Glorieta Pass. The steep grades posed operational problems, including congestion, slow speeds, and the need for helper engines. As an interim solution, a second track, with a longer tunnel, was opened at Raton in 1908, but this simply added capacity, and the grades remained. In 1902 the Santa Fe began surveying a new cutoff that would bypass this segment entirely. Much of the route had already been constructed by subsidiaries, such as the Southern Kansas Railway, which built a branch to Amarillo, Texas, in the 1880s, and the Pecos Valley and Northeastern Railway, an 1899 extension from Amarillo to Pecos via Texico, New Mexico. To complete the line between Texico and a point northwest of Belen, New Mexico, the Santa Fe incorporated the Eastern Railway of New Mexico in October 1902, and began construction of the Belen Cutoff the next January. The entire line was completed on July 1, 1908, allowing through freight trains to bypass the 3–3.5% grades of the old line for the maximum grade of 1.25% (at Abo Canyon) on the new line. (Most passenger trains continued to use Raton Pass so as to serve Colorado.) The Pecos Valley and Northeastern (but not its Texas subsidiaries, because of Article X of the Texas Constitution) was consolidated into the Eastern in March 1907, and in January 1912, the property of the Eastern was conveyed to the Santa Fe. To connect central Texas to this line, the Pecos and Northern Texas Railway completed the Coleman Cutoff, running southeast from Texico to the Santa Fe subsidiary Gulf, Colorado and Santa Fe Railway at Coleman, in 1914. A third line was almost completed in the 1920s and 1930s, when the Santa Fe built the majority of the planned Dodge City–Colmer (Colmer Cutoff), which would provide a second bypass of Raton (but not Glorieta), but construction stopped at Farley, and the line was torn up west of Boise City in 1942.

The completion of the Belen Cutoff did not end improvements to the transcontinental route. The  Ellinor Cutoff opened in 1924, cutting through the Flint Hills from the original main line at Ellinor, Kansas, southwest to El Dorado on the main line to Texas. This allowed trains bound for the Belen Cutoff to cut directly to Mulvane, bypassing Wichita to the southeast. To the west, in Arizona, the Santa Fe constructed a new line between Williams and Crookton, bypassing the sharp curves and steep grades of the line via Ash Fork built by the Atlantic and Pacific Railroad in the 1880s. The $19.3-million realignment opened on December 19, 1960, and the old line was abandoned west of the Phoenix connection at Ash Fork. Smaller improvements included installation of centralized traffic control on the Belen Cutoff in the 1940s. Also, by October of 2018, the entire Southern Transcon was double-tracked, except for two bridges; and, projects were underway to add triple- and even quadruple-track along the busiest parts.

Constituent rail lines 

The Southern Transcon railroad corridor is made up of the following BNSF rail lines which are referred to as subdivisions, in order from west to east.

Passenger trains 
Parts of the route are utilized by passenger rail services — BNSF does not operate regular passenger trains outside of the Chicago Subdivision.

Amtrak's Southwest Chief runs once daily in each direction on the Transcon, but via the Raton Pass. The Pacific Surfliner also operates between Los Angeles and Fullerton. Until its cancellation in 1997, Amtrak's Desert Wind used the Southern Transcon between Los Angeles and Barstow. The proposed Coachella Valley Rail train from RCTC, which is anticipated to be operated by Amtrak, would initially run two roundtrips a day over the Transcon from LA Union Station to the Colton Crossing.

Southern California's Metrolink commuter trains utilize the route between Los Angeles and San Bernardino. These include the Orange County Line (between Los Angeles and Fullerton), 91/Perris Valley Line (between Los Angeles and Highgrove), and Inland Empire–Orange County Line (between Atwood and San Bernardino).

See also 

 Northern Transcon
 Central Corridor (Union Pacific Railroad)
 Fort Madison Toll Bridge

References

External links 
A user-made map of the full route on Google My Maps

BNSF Railway lines
Atchison, Topeka and Santa Fe Railway
Rail lines in California
Rail lines in Illinois
Railway lines opened in 1908
Atchison, Topeka and Santa Fe Railway lines